Redaksi (English: The Editorial) is a television newscast aired on Indonesian television network Trans7 (since 17 December 2006) and CNN Indonesia (since 5 March 2018). The slogan is "Mendalam, Terpercaya" (English:Indepth, Trusted).

References

External links 

 Trans 7 official website
 CNN Indonesia official website

Indonesian television news shows
Indonesian-language television shows
2007 Indonesian television series debuts
2021 Indonesian television series debuts
2000s Indonesian television series
Trans7 original programming
CNN Indonesia original programming